Karel Kula (born 10 August 1963) is a Czech local politician and former football player and manager. He played as a midfielder and was a general manager of MFK Karviná and FK Fotbal Třinec. In 2023, he became the mayor of Český Těšín.

Playing career

Club level
After making his professional debut at the age of 18, with FC Baník Ostrava (with a two-year loan during his spell at the club), Kula amassed more than 200 official appearances with the team. In 1991, he won the Czechoslovak Cup with Baník.

At 28, Kula was allowed to leave the country, spending the next four years in Germany, three of those with SG Wattenscheid 09. Although he made his first division debuts for Stuttgarter Kickers in the 1991–92 season, his six league goals (third in the team) were not enough to prevent relegation (in 17th position).

Aged 32, Kula returned to his country, now the Czech Republic. After one and a half years with SK Železárny Třinec, he closed out his career with first club Baník in 1998.

International level
Kula played for the youth national teams of Czechoslovakia including the 1983 FIFA World Youth Championship, as did his twin brother Vlastimil. During seven years in the senior side, he gained 40 caps, the first coming in 1985. He did not attend, however, any major international tournaments, being overlooked for the squad which appeared at the 1990 FIFA World Cup.

Managerial career

Kula worked with Baník as assistant manager from 2006 to 2008, and then in the same role at FK Fotbal Třinec. In 2010, he gained his first managerial position at Karviná. In March 2012, Kula was replaced as manager of Karviná by assistant Marek Kalivoda. He returned to FK Fotbal Třinec for the 2013–14 season as general manager; his successor was Marek Kalivoda.

Political career
In March 2023, Kula became the mayor of Český Těšín.

References

External links
 
 
 
 

1963 births
Living people
Sportspeople from Třinec
Czechoslovak footballers
Czech footballers
Association football midfielders
Czech First League players
FC Baník Ostrava players
FK Fotbal Třinec players
Bundesliga players
2. Bundesliga players
Stuttgarter Kickers players
SG Wattenscheid 09 players
Czechoslovakia international footballers
Czech expatriate footballers
Czech football managers
MFK Karviná managers
FK Fotbal Třinec managers
Czechoslovak expatriate footballers
Expatriate footballers in Germany
Czechoslovak expatriate sportspeople in Germany
Czech expatriate sportspeople in Germany
FK Dukla Banská Bystrica players
Czech National Football League managers
Czech sportsperson-politicians